Ocean Kinetics is a private limited engineering company based in Lerwick, Scotland. The company was established by John Henderson in 1992 to specialise in marine engineering solutions.

History
Established in 1992, the company has expanded to an engineering company in fabrication, oil and gas, renewables, and fishing and aquaculture. The first purpose-built buildings of the company were opened in 1998, and as the company grew an extension was added 2000 and additional stores in 2002.

Ocean Kinetics expanded its premises in 2012 after announcing its expansion plans of £2M of which £240,000 of funding was provided by Highlands and Islands Enterprise (HIE) and £500,000 funded by the Regional Selective Assistance (RSA) scheme.

In 2015 the firm was called upon to carry out repairs at the Antarctic Rothera Research Station,.

A supply partnership with John Bell Pipeline was also strengthened in August 2015, to help  increase the volume of sales in the United Kingdom and overseas.

References

External links
  Official website

Technology companies established in 1992
Lerwick
Engineering companies of Scotland
Companies based in Shetland
1992 establishments in Scotland